Kendle is a surname. Notable people with the surname include:

Charles Kendle (1875–1954), English cricketer
Jeremy Kendle (born 1988), American basketball player
Lukace Kendle, American murderer
William Kendle (1847–1920), English cricketer

See also
Kendall (surname)

English-language surnames